Jesenice is a city in Slovenia.

Jesenice is a toponym deriving from one of the two meanings of the word "jesen" in various Slavic languages: "ash tree" or "autumn", and may also refer to:

Croatia 
 Jesenice, Croatia, a settlement near Dugi Rat

Czech Republic 
Jesenice (Prague-West District), a town
Jesenice (Příbram District), a municipality and village
Jesenice (Rakovník District), a town
Jesenice, a village and part of Okrouhlá (Cheb District)
Jesenice, a village and part of Příbram
Velká Jesenice, a village

Slovenia 
 Jesenice, Brežice, a village
 Dolenje Jesenice, a village in the Municipality of Šentrupert
 Gorenje Jesenice, a village in the Municipality of Šentrupert

See also
 Jasenice (disambiguation)